The brown madtom (Noturus phaeus) is a species of madtom catfish native to the southern United States.

Distribution
The distribution of the brown madtom includes disjunct tributaries of the Mississippi River from the Obion River in Tennessee and Kentucky south to southwestern Mississippi and central and northern Louisiana extending to extreme southern Arkansas. It occupies creeks and small rivers with sand-gravel riffles and runs with debris, rocks, and undercut banks.

References

Noturus
Madtom
Endemic fauna of the United States
Freshwater fish of the Southeastern United States
Fish described in 1969